Building a Beginning is a studio album by English musician Jamie Lidell. It was released on 14 October 2016. This album marks Lidell's departure from long time label Warp. Instead, it was released on Lidell's own label Jajulin Records with distribution handled by Kobalt.

Track listing

Charts

References

External links
 

2016 albums
Jamie Lidell albums